Socoura  is a village and rural commune in the Cercle of Mopti in the Mopti Region of Mali. The commune contains 28 small villages and in 2009 had a population of 42,553. The commune entirely surrounds the urban commune of Mopti.

References

External links
.

Communes of Mopti Region